This list of tallest buildings in Chongqing ranks skyscrapers in Chongqing, China by height. The tallest buildings in Chongqing are currently towers T3N and T4N of Raffles City Chongqing, which each rise 354.5 m (1,163 feet).

Chongqing is the largest city in China and the only  provincial-level municipality (which means the municipal jurisdiction covers an entire administrative region and there is no separate provincial government) in western and central China, with more than 18 million people living in the urban area and total population of 30 million in the administrative region.

Chongqing is the political, economic, financial, and cultural centre of the interior and West of China, it is one of China's major industrial cities; and along with the other major industrial centres it is experiencing rapid urban growth accompanied by a construction boom.

With 26 buildings taller than 200 meters, all of them built in the last decade, Chongqing's skyline is rapidly rising, and is now ranked among the world's twenty tallest.

Tallest buildings

This lists ranks Chongqing skyscrapers that stand at least 150 m (492 feet) tall, based on standard height measurement. This includes spires and architectural details but does not include antenna masts. Existing structures are included for ranking purposes based on present height. All the structures in this list has been topped, but some may not be ready to use.

Tallest under construction, approved, and proposed

Under construction
This lists buildings that are under construction in Chongqing and are planned to rise at least 150 m (492 feet). Buildings that have already been topped out are not included.

* Table entries without text indicate that information regarding building heights, floor counts, and/or dates of completion has not yet been released.

Approved
This lists buildings that are approved for construction in Chongqing and are planned to rise at least 150 m (492 feet).

* Table entries without text indicate that information regarding building heights, and/or dates of completion has not yet been released.

Proposed
This lists buildings that are proposed for construction in Chongqing and are planned to rise at least 150 m (492 feet).

* Table entries without text indicate that information regarding building heights, floor counts, and/or dates of completion has not yet been released.

References
General
Emporis.com – Chongqing
Skycraperpage.com – Chongqing
Specific

External links
 Diagram of Chongqing skyscrapers on SkyscraperPage
 Skyscrapers of Chongqing on Gaoloumi (in Chinese)
The World's best Skyline

Chongqing

Chongqing-related lists